Frank O'Reilly (7 April 1924 – 20 March 2001) was an Irish racewalker. He competed in the men's 50 kilometres walk at the 1960 Summer Olympics.

References

External links
 

1924 births
2001 deaths
Athletes (track and field) at the 1960 Summer Olympics
Irish male racewalkers
Olympic athletes of Ireland
Place of birth missing